Top Secret Bountry and Clues, also known as Blues and Clues is a demo CD which is only being sold at shows of The Slackers' organist/lead singer, Vic Ruggiero. The album was informally released in 2006 and resembles a mix of country and blues songs. There is a US and a European version of the demo.

Track listing (US Version)
 "Clandestine" (3:08)
 "California" (3:49)
 "I Don't Wanna" (2:37)
 "Lies" (4:12)
 "Remember" (4:05)
 "Sleepy and Sad" (1:59)
 "Newstead Abbey" (3:32)
 "Slugs" (3:23)
 "New Jersey Story..." (3:01)

Track listing (European Version)
 "Clandestine"
 "Don't Wanna" (Same song as "I Don't Wanna" from the US Version)
 "Lies"
 "Lonely Nites" (Same song as "Remember" from the US Version)
 "Ballads Of Illness"
 "Slugs"
 "Lord Byron" (Same song as "Newstead Abbey" from the US Version)

2006 albums
Vic Ruggiero albums